Waterman may refer to:

 Waterman (occupation), a river worker who transferred passengers across and along the city centre rivers in Britain
 The Chesapeake Bay term for commercial fishermen, particularly those who seek oysters and the blue crab
 Waterman (film), a documentary about the life of Hawaiian athlete Duke Kahanamoku

Places 
 Waterman, Illinois, a village in the United States
 Waterman, Oregon, a former U.S. town amid cattle ranches
 Waterman, Washington
 Waterman, Western Australia, now known as Watermans Bay, Western Australia
 Waterman (crater), a lunar impact crater

Other uses 
 Waterman (surname)
 1822 Waterman, a stony asteroid from the inner regions of the asteroid belt.
 Alan T. Waterman Award, a prize awarded by the US National Science Foundation
 Smith–Waterman algorithm
 Water Man (novel), a 1993 novel by Roger McDonald
 Waterman (web series), an online animated feature
 "Waterman" (song), the Eurovision Song Contest 1970 song by Hearts of Soul
 Waterman butterfly projection
 Waterman pens, a luxury pen company
 Waterman Philéas, a series of writing pens
 Waterman Steamship Corporation
 USS Waterman, a 1943 Cannon-class destroyer escort
 "The Water Man", an 1826 Slovene ballad

See also 
 Wassermann (disambiguation)
 Justice Waterman (disambiguation)